Senator Downs may refer to:

C. H. "Sammy" Downs (1911–1985), Louisiana State Senate
Daniel Downs (1824–1897), Wisconsin State Senate
Solomon W. Downs (1801–1854), U.S. Senator from Louisiana 1847 to 1853